Grosskreutz, Großkreutz or Groß Kreutz, meaning "great cross" in German, may refer to:

People
Gaige Grosskreutz (born 1994), wounded in the Kenosha unrest shooting in 2020
Kevin Großkreutz (born 1988), German footballer
Max Grosskreutz (1906–1994), Australian speedway rider

Places
Groß Kreutz, municipality in Brandenburg, Germany